Collective depression is one of many collective mental states, such as collective elation, collective paranoia, collective trauma, or collective grief, which may affect a group, community or whole nation. It is characterised by a prevailing and seemingly permanent sense of inadequacy, despondency, lack of vitality, sadness and hopelessness, shared by a high proportion of the members of a collectivity. As shown by Gustave Le Bon in 1895, it can be passed by contagion, in a way similar to a physical condition.

Collective depression is often found in detained communities, such as ghettos, concentration camps or other places where all prospects of release are extremely improbable, and is recognisable by a high incidence of suicide.

There is debate over the philosophical status of the concept: while Sigmund Freud, Carl Jung, Franz Borkenau and many others accepted the existence of a collective mind or collective unconscious, much modern thinking treats collective depression as an aggregate of individuals depressions. However, there is growing interest in the concept of mass sociogenic illness where a physical or psychological condition is observed to spread within a group without a common organic cause.

The remedy for collective depression is the restoration of hope, though this may be a task beyond the capabilities of any leader of a community. Collective depression can also be a state of considerable vulnerability, as destructive strategies may be clutched at through misplaced belief in the efficacy of radical measures.

References 

 Bartholomew, Robert E.; Simon Wessely (2002). "Protean nature of mass sociogenic illness". The British Journal of Psychiatry 180 (4): 300–306. . . http://bjp.rcpsych.org/content/180/4/300 Retrieved 2011-9-23.
 Borkenau, Franz, 1981. End and Beginning, On the Generations of Cultures and the Origins of the West. (ed. and intro. by Richard Lowenthal). New York: Columbia University Press.
 Bostock, William W., (2007). Retrieved 2011-9-23 Collective Depression: Its Nature, Causation and Alleviation. In: Bernie Warren, Ed., Suffering the slings and arrows of outrageous fortune: International perspectives on stress, laughter and depression. At the Interface (Volume 31). Rodolpi: Amsterdam, New York, pp. 1–12. 
 Freud, Sigmund, (1955). Beyond the Pleasure Principle, Group Psychology and Other Works. In Standard Edition, XVIII (1920–1922). London: Hogarth.
 Jung, Carl G., (1959). The Collected Works of C. G. Jung. (17 Volumes). London: Routledge & Kegan Paul.
 Le Bon, G., (1960). (First Published 1895). The Mind of the Crowd. New York: Viking.

Depression (mood)